The Guestbook Project is an international, non-profit housed at Boston College and directed by Richard Kearney and Sheila Gallagher. Its mission is to transform hostility into hospitality through conversation and conflict resolution.

History 
The Guestbook Project began ten years with the intention of using the power of storytelling to heal divided communities and societies around the world. To that end, Guestbook often features conversations of people from dissenting backgrounds, and attempts to have them share their side of the story, listen to the other side, and evantually come to “invent a new story together.” The Guestbook Project has recorded several stories from divided groups around the world, including: Mitrovica (Kosovo), Derry (Northern Ireland), Jerusalem (Israel/Palestine), Bangalore (India), Dokdo (Japan/Korea), Cape Town (South Africa), and the Mexican-American border (El Centro). At the moment, the Guestbook Project has over sixty storybites and documentaries on its online platform; the most recent of which being, Sheltering Strangers, which depicts the story of a Greek orphanage for Syrian refugee children.

Guestbook team

Publications 
Books

Radical Hospitality: From Thought to Action (Fordham University Press, 2020)

Hosting the Stranger: Between Religions (Continuum, 2011)

Phenomenologies of the Stranger: Between Hostility and Hospitality (Fordham University Press, 2020)

Traversing the Heart: Journeys of the Inter-religious Imagination (Brill 2010)

On Hosting The Stranger: The New Arcadia Review Vol. 4 (Guestbook 2009)

Hospitality: Imagining the Stranger (Religion and the Arts 2009)

Articles

Double Hospitality—Between Word and Touch
By Richard Kearney
In Journal for Continental Philosophy of Religion, 1 (2019)

Linguistic Hospitality—The Risk of Translation
By Richard Kearney
In Research in Phenomenology, 49 (2019)

Race, pre-college philosophy, and the pursuit of a critical race pedagogy for higher education
By Melissa Fitzpatrick
In Ethics and Education (2018)

Across oceans: A conversation on otherness, hospitality and welcoming a strange God
By Richard Kearney, Daniël P. Veldsman, and Yolande Steencamp
In Debating Otherness with Richard Kearney: Perspectives from South Africa, ed. Yolande Steenkamp and Daniël P. Veldsman (2018)

Hospitality: Possible or Impossible?
By Richard Kearney
In Hospitality and Society, Numbers 2 & 3, Volume 5, eds. Paul Lynch, Alison McIntosh, and Jennie Germann Molz (2015)

Hospitality, the Foundation of Dialogue
By Richard Kearney
In The Japan Mission Journal, ed. Joseph O’Leary (Autumn 2014)

Two Prophets of Eucharistic Hospitality
By Richard Kearney
In The Japan Mission Journal, ed. Joseph O’Leary (Spring 2014)

Translating Across Faith Cultures: Radical Hospitality
By Richard Kearney
In Perspectiva Nova Eco-Ethics, Revue internationale de philosophie moderne, Acta institutionis philosophiae et aestheticae, ed. Y. Ilmamichi (2014)

The Hermeneutics of the Gift: A Dialogue with Eric Severson
By Richard Kearney and Eric R. Severson
In Gift and Economy: Ethics, Hospitality and the Market, ed. Eric Severson (2012)

Beyond Conflict: Radical Hospitality and Religious Identity
By Richard Kearney
In Philosophy and the Return of Violence: Studies from this Widening Gyre, ed. Chris Yates and Nathan Eckstrand (2011)

Imagining the Sacred Stranger: Hostility or Hospitality?
By Richard Kearney
In Politics and the Religious Imagination, ed. Jens Zimmerman (2010)

Welcoming the Stranger
By Richard Kearney
In All Changed? Culture and Identity in Contemporary Ireland, The Fifth Seamus Heaney Lecture Series, eds. Padraig O Duibhir, Rory Mc Daid and Andrew O’Shea (2011)

Images of Strangers
By Richard Kearney
In Engage, ed. Karen Raney (2004)

Strangers and Others: From Deconstruction to Hermeneutics
By Richard Kearney
In Critical Horizons, 3, 1 (2002)

Interviews

Intercultural encounters as hospitality: An interview with Richard Kearney
By Breffni O’Rourke
In Journal of Virtual Exchange, Vol 1 (2018)

We have learned from Covid how much we miss touch
By Joe Humphreys
In The Irish Times (2021)

Storybites
Storybites is a Guestbook project aimed at having people share stories that led to a surprising shift in their perspective. Participants in the project record a short conversation about some epiphany that they had with a member from a dissenting group, and those videos are then featured on Guestbook's online platform.

References

Organizations
Academic organizations based in the United States